The David Syme Research Prize is an annual award administered by the University of Melbourne for the best original research work in biology, physics, chemistry or geology, produced in Australia during the preceding two years, particular preference is given to original research to enhance industrial and/or commercial development.

The Prize was created at the university in 1904 when Melbourne newspaper publisher and owner of The Age David Syme made a £3,000 bequest for the foundation of the prize. The first prize was awarded in 1906. The publishers of The Age have continued to fund the award. The prize consists of a medal and of the interest from the original bequest (since 2020 an amount of the order of A$10,000), which may be topped-up further by the publishers. The recipient(s) of the award is chosen by a council selected from the university's Faculty of Science.

Recipients
Source: University of Melbourne
1906 – Edward Henry Embley
1907 – Harold Launcelot Wilkinson
1908 – Basil Kilvington
1909 – Harold Ingemann Jensen
1910 – Henry George Chapman
1911 – Georgina Sweet
1912 – Charles Oswald ; George Larcombe
1913 – Thomas Harvey Johnston
1914 – Joseph Mason Baldwin
1915 – Ernest Clayton Andrews, for his works on 'The Cobar Copper and Gold Field' and subsequent surveys
1916 – Charles Hedley
1917 – Henry Joseph Grayson
1918 – Thomas Griffith Taylor
1919 – Frank Leslie Stillwell
1920 – Frederick Chapman
1921 – Neil Hamilton Fairley
1922 – Henry George Smith
1923 – Frank Longstaff Apperley
1924 – Loftus Hills
1925 – James Stanley Rogers
1926 – Ernst Johannes Hartung
1927 – Harold Robert Dew ; Ethel Irene McLennan
1928 – Oscar Werner Tiegs
1929 – Charles Albert Edward Fenner for his  thesis, Adelaide, South Australia A Study in Human Geography

1930 – Reuben Thomas Patton
1931 – Cecil Ernest Eddy ; Samuel John King
1932 – Arthur William Turner
1933 – Ian William Wark
1934 – Walter George Kannaluik ; Leslie Harold Martin
1935 – Rupert Allan Willis
1936 – Donald Finlay ; Fergusson Thomson
1937 – Austin Burton Evans ; Roy Douglas Wright
1938 – No award
1939 – William Davies
1940 – Edwin Sherbon Hills ; Howard Knox Worner
1941 – Frederick Alexander Singleton
1942 – Everton Rowe Trethewie
1943 – Brian John Grieve ; Victor David Hopper
1944 – George Baker ; Francis Norman Lahey
1945 – John Stewart Anderson ; Frank Herbert Shaw
1946 – H. Leighton Kesteven ; Fletcher Donaldson Cruikshank
1947 – Avon Maxwell Clark
1948 – Keith Leonard Sutherland
1949 – Frank John Fenner
1950 – Curt Teichert
1951 – Alfred Gottschalk ; Hill Wesley Worner
1952 – Henri Daniel Rathgeber ; G. Reid
1953 – Douglas Frew Waterhouse ; Francis Patrick Dwyer 
1954 – Alexander McLeod Mathieson ; Alexander Thomas Dick
1955 – Herbert George Andrewartha ; L. C. Birch
1956 – Charles H.B. Priestley
1957 – Leonard Ernest Samuels
1958 – Jack Hobart Piddington
1959 – Ronald Drayton Brown ; Wilbur Norman Christiansen
1960 – W.D. Jackson ; Brian Milton Spicer
1961 – Leo Michael Clarebrough ; Michael H. Loretto
1963 – Frank William Ernest Gibson
1964 – Donald Metcalf ; Arthur William Pryor ; T. Sabine ; D. Walker ; B. Hickman
1965 – L.R. Clark ; John Melvyn Swan
1966 – L. Nichol ; Guy Kendall White
1967 – Norman Keith Boardman ; L.F. Henderson 
1968 – R.M. May ; T.A. O'Donnell ; J.V. Sullivan
1969 – R. Colton ; Alfred James "Jim" Pittard ; Alan Kenneth Head
1970 – James Howard Bradbury ; J.R. Egerton ; M.E. Hargreaves ; Winfred Nayler
1971 – Arthur James Dyer ; Bruce B. Hicks
1972 – Richard Limon Stanton
1973 – Malcolm A. S. Moore for his research work in the study of myeloid leukaemia
1974 – David Leslie Kepert
1975 – Garth William Paltridge 
1976 – David H. Solomon
1977 – Ian Hamilton Holmes
1978 – Alan M. Bond
1979 – John Warwick Anderson
1980 – Le Roy Freame Henderson ; William Hugh Sawyer
1981 – Frank Andrew Smith ; N.A. Walker
1982 – Suzanne Cory; Jerry Mckee Adams
1983 – Jacob Nissim Israelachvili ; L.A. Bursill
1984 – Ronald Cooper
1985 – Greg Dusting
1986 – Roger J. Summers
1987 – Anthony James Underwood ; H.M. Geysen
1988 – Ronald Holden Vernon
1989 – James B. Reid
1993 – Philip Beart
1994 – Stephen Hyde ; Steven Prawer
1995 – Igor Bray
1997 – Ralph MacNally
1998 – Paul Mulvaney
1999 – Anthony Weiss
2000 –  Geoff McFadden – Plasmodium research ; Mark Humphrey
2001 – Richard O'Hair ; Mark Graeme Humphrey
2002 – Calum Drummond
2003 – Graham Baldwin ; Bernard Luke Flynn
2004  – David Jackson for commercialisation of synthetic peptide technology ; Trevor Lithgow for discovery of the protein Omp85. 
2005 – Brendan Crabb – malaria research at the Walter and Eliza Hall Institute
2006 – Christopher Chantler ; Mark Rizzacasa
2007 – Stuart Wyithe
2008 – David C.S. Huang
2009 – Michael R Kearney
2010 – Harry Quiney
2011 – Robert Scholten
2012 – Lars Kjer-Nielsen
2013 – Andrea Morello
2014 – Spencer Williams
2015 – Paul Donnelly ; Dr Peter Macreadie
2016 – Igor Aharonovich ; Cynthia Whitchurch
2017 – Wai-Hong Tham
2018 – Luhua Li
2019 – Luke Connal
2020 – Fan Wang ; Marco Herold
2021 – Nicolas Flament

See also 

 List of general science and technology awards

References

Australian science and technology awards
University of Melbourne
Awards established in 1904
1904 establishments in Australia